Edvinas Vaškelis (born 20 June 1996 in Vilkaviškis, Lithuania) is a Lithuanian volleyball player who currently playing for Volleyball Bisons Bühl playing in Deutsche Volleyball-Bundesliga.

In 2014 Vaškelis represented Lithuania in 2014 Summer Youth Olympics.

References

External links
 CEV profile
 
 
 

1996 births
Lithuanian men's volleyball players
People from Vilkaviškis
Beach volleyball players at the 2014 Summer Youth Olympics
Living people